Northern Trains, branded as Northern, (legally Northern Trains Limited) is a publicly owned train operating company in England. It is owned by DfT OLR Holdings for the Department for Transport (DfT), after the previous operator Arriva Rail North had its franchise terminated at the end of February 2020.

Northern Trains commenced operating the Northern franchise on 1 March 2020, taking over from Arriva Rail North. The prior operator had its franchise terminated early by the DfT in January 2020 amid widespread dissatisfaction over its performance, particularly in respect to poorly-implemented timetable changes. The DfT had opted to hand the operation of the franchise over to the operator of last resort. At the commencement of operations, Northern Trains publicly stated that its immediate aims were to improve service reliability and to proceed with the introduction of new rolling stock. For the latter, both the Class 195 diesel multiple units and Class 331 electric multiple units were brought into service fully during December 2020.

Services have been disrupted by wider events, particularly the COVID-19 pandemic. Northern Trains is also being impacted by the 2022–2023 United Kingdom railway strikes, the largest national rail strikes in the UK in three decades.

History

Background
In December 2015, the Department for Transport (DfT) awarded Arriva a contract to operate the Northern franchise as Arriva Rail North. It commenced in April 2016 and was originally scheduled to run until March 2025. Within two years, the franchise was being widely criticised, in particular for troubled implementation of a new timetable in May 2018 that resulted in widespread delays and cancellations. Later in 2018 performance continued to suffer, with many passengers protesting and a reduced service on Saturdays due to industrial action. By November 2018, Arriva were re-evaluating their future involvement in the franchise due to a combination of declining passenger numbers as a result of the chaotic May 2018 timetable change and increasing compensation claims as a result of falling punctuality.

In June 2019, the DfT's operator of last resort, DfT OLR Holdings, conducted due diligence into the franchise believing the both operational and financial performance to be "unsustainable". In October 2019, the Secretary of State for Transport, Grant Shapps, issued a request for proposals to incumbent operator Arriva and the operator of last resort, which would result in termination of the franchise with either Arriva to be awarded a short-term management contract or the operator of last resort to take over. In January 2020, Shapps publicly criticised Arriva's operation of the Northern franchise and suggested that the Government may step in to revoke its franchise agreement, bluntly referring to the service as "completely unacceptable".

On 29 January 2020, the DfT announced its decision to terminate Arriva Northern's franchise and that the operator of last resort would take over. This was the first time that a franchise has been removed from a train operating company due to poor performance since Connex South Eastern in 2003. On 1 March 2020, the franchise became directly operated by DfT OLR Holdings for the DfT, adopting the brand name 'Northern Trains'', with the stated objective to "stabilise performance and restore reliability for passengers".

Changes and events
By mid-2020, Northern Trains had considerably curtailed its services in response to the significant decline of passenger travel amid the COVID-19 pandemic. From 15 June 2020, both passengers and staff on public transport in England, including Northern Trains services, were required to wear face coverings while travelling, and that anyone failing to do so would be liable to be refused travel or fined.

In 2021 Northern Trains was given a contract by the Department for Transport to run services for three years, with an optional extension of a further two years. The contract was updated in 2022, to run until 1 March 2025.

Northern Trains is one of several train operators impacted by the 2022–2023 United Kingdom railway strikes, which are the first national rail strikes in the UK for three decades. Its workers are amongst those who voted to take industrial action due a dispute over pay and working conditions. Northern Trains urged the travelling public to avoid travelling on its services on any of the planned dates for the strikes, being only capable of operating a minimal timetable due to the number of staff involved.

Services
Northern took over all the services operated by Arriva Rail North on 1 March 2020.

Table of off-peak services

Below is a simplified list of frequent Monday to Saturday off-peak services, per December 2022 timetables. Due to the extensive nature of the network, it has been split by region, then majority rail line.

North East

North West

Yorkshire and the Humber

Parliamentary services

From 1992 until 2018, this service ran once weekly.

Multiple campaigns were conducted to request increase in services to the line, but in 2022, Transport for Greater Manchester published two surveys in relation to the line.

The service was suspended between January and October 2022 due to concerns related to the COVID-19 pandemic.

Rolling stock
Northern Trains took over all of the rolling stock operated by its predecessor, namely Class 142, 144, 150, 153, 155, 156, 158, 170 and 195 diesel multiple units and Class 319, 321, 322, 323, 331 and 333 electric multiple units. All Class 321 and 322s were withdrawn in mid-2020 and moved to Greater Anglia. All Class 153s were sent to storage by December 2021.

Current fleet

Future fleet
17 Class 323s are to be transferred from West Midlands Trains. This will result in the withdrawal of all Class 319 units. 15 Class 156s are to transfer from East Midlands Railway, which includes the 9 Class 156/9s formerly used by Greater Anglia, although they will be renumbered back to 156/4s before they are transferred. For the December timetable change in 2022, five more Class 156 units were transferred. The transferral of these units is already underway, with more to follow.

Past fleet
Former train types operated by Northern Trains include:

Depots

Northern Trains currently has depots for its train crew at Barrow-in-Furness, Blackburn, Blackpool North, Buxton, Carlisle, Darlington (drivers), Doncaster, Harrogate, Huddersfield, Hull, Liverpool Lime Street, Leeds, Manchester Piccadilly, Manchester Victoria, Middlesbrough (conductors), Newcastle, Sheffield, Skipton, Wigan Wallgate, Workington and York.

Northern Trains' fleet is maintained at depots listed in the table below:

Notes

References

External links

 

Department for Transport
Operators of last resort
Railway companies established in 2020
2020 establishments in England